The Daily Reporter is a daily newspaper published in Coldwater, Michigan, in the United States. It is owned by Gannett. Former owner GateHouse Media acquired the paper from Independent Media Group in 2000.

In addition to Coldwater, the paper covers several other cities and villages in Branch County, Michigan, including Bronson, Quincy and Union City.

The newspaper was founded in December 1895.

References

External links 
 

Gannett publications
Newspapers published in Michigan
Branch County, Michigan
Publications established in 1895